Charles Henry Bigelow (26 Aug 1872 Kilbourne, Illinois – 08 Jun 1958 Los Angeles, California) was an American racecar driver. He is no relation to fellow Indy 500 driver Tom Bigelow.

Bigelow drove in the inaugural Indianapolis 500.

Indy 500 results

Source:

References

External links
 

1872 births
1958 deaths
Indianapolis 500 drivers
People from Mason County, Illinois
Racing drivers from Illinois